Black cube may refer to:
 Black Cube, a private intelligence agency
 Blackballing, a vote of rejection in a secret ballot
 The Kaaba, a black cubical building at the center of the Grand Mosque of Mecca; it is the most sacred site in Islam